The 2006 Castle Point Borough Council election took place on 4 May 2006 to elect members of Castle Point Borough Council in Essex, England. One third of the council was up for election and the Conservative party stayed in overall control of the council.

After the election, the composition of the council was
Conservative: 29
Canvey Island Independent Party: 11
Labour: 1

Election result
The Conservative party stayed in control of the council but lost 5 seats on Canvey Island to the Canvey Island Independent Party. The Conservatives won all 8 mainland seats that were contested, while the Canvey Island Independent Party won 5 of the 6 seats on the island.

Ward results

References

Castle Point Borough Council elections
2006 English local elections
2000s in Essex